Bukowiec may refer to:
Bukovec (Frýdek-Místek District), known in Polish as "Bukowiec", a village in the Czech Republic
Bukowiec, Jelenia Góra County in Lower Silesian Voivodeship (south-west Poland)
Bukowiec, Trzebnica County in Lower Silesian Voivodeship (south-west Poland)
Bukowiec, Brodnica County in Kuyavian-Pomeranian Voivodeship (north-central Poland)
Bukowiec, Grudziądz County in Kuyavian-Pomeranian Voivodeship (north-central Poland)
Bukowiec, Świecie County in Kuyavian-Pomeranian Voivodeship (north-central Poland)
Bukowiec, Lublin Voivodeship (east Poland)
Bukowiec, Łódź East County in Łódź Voivodeship (central Poland)
Bukowiec, Sieradz County in Łódź Voivodeship (central Poland)
Bukowiec, Tomaszów Mazowiecki County in Łódź Voivodeship (central Poland)
Bukowiec, Lesser Poland Voivodeship (south Poland)
Bukowiec, Bieszczady County in Subcarpathian Voivodeship (south-east Poland)
Bukowiec, Kolbuszowa County in Subcarpathian Voivodeship (south-east Poland)
Bukowiec, Lesko County in Subcarpathian Voivodeship (south-east Poland)
Bukowiec, Chodzież County in Greater Poland Voivodeship (west-central Poland)
Bukowiec, Czarnków-Trzcianka County in Greater Poland Voivodeship (west-central Poland)
Bukowiec, Nowy Tomyśl County in Greater Poland Voivodeship (west-central Poland)
Bukowiec, Wągrowiec County in Greater Poland Voivodeship (west-central Poland)
Bukowiec, Silesian Voivodeship (south Poland)
Bukowiec, Lubusz Voivodeship (west Poland)
Bukowiec, Pomeranian Voivodeship (north Poland)
Bukowiec, Bartoszyce County in Warmian-Masurian Voivodeship (north Poland)
Bukowiec, Iława County in Warmian-Masurian Voivodeship (north Poland)

See also
 
 Bukovec (disambiguation)
 Bukovets (disambiguation)